The 1985 National Panasonic Cup was the 12th edition of the NSWRL Midweek Cup, a NSWRL-organised national club Rugby League tournament between the leading clubs and representative teams from the NSWRL, the BRL, the CRL and the NZRL.

A total of 16 teams from across Australia and New Zealand played 15 matches in a straight knock-out format, with the matches being held midweek during the premiership season.

Qualified Teams

Venues

Round 1

 * The St George V South Sydney game also functioned as the Charity Shield for this season.

Quarter finals

Semi finals

Final

Player of the Series
 Scott Gale (Balmain)

Golden Try
 Garry Jack (Balmain)

Sources
 https://web.archive.org/web/20070929092832/http://users.hunterlink.net.au/~maajjs/aus/nsw/sum/nsw1985.htm

1985
1985 in Australian rugby league
1985 in New Zealand rugby league